Artabanus III ( Ardawān), incorrectly known in older scholarship as Artabanus IV, was a Parthian prince who competed against his brother Pacorus II for the Parthian crown from 79/80 to 81. Artabanus III's claim to the throne seems to have little support in the Parthian Empire, with the exception of Babylonia. Artabanus III's most notable action was to give refuge to a Pseudo-Nero named Terentius Maximus. Artabanus III initially agreed to lend military aid to Terentius Maximus to capture Rome, until he found about the real identity of the impostor. Coin mints of Artabanus III disappear after 81, which suggests that Pacorus II had defeated him.

References

Sources
  (2 volumes)
 

1st-century Parthian monarchs
81 deaths
1st-century births
1st-century Iranian people
1st-century Babylonian kings